Tjakkatjakka Ston was a village in the Boven Coppename resort of the Sipaliwini District in Suriname. According to Dirk van der Elst, the village had been abandoned and already been taken over by the jungle in 1973.

References

Bibliography
 

Former populated places in Suriname